Ogmore is a village in the Vale of Glamorgan, Wales on the River Ogmore.  It grew around the now ruined Ogmore Castle, built by the Normans.

The village does not lie in the parliamentary constituency also called Ogmore, which lies further up the Ogmore River in Bridgend and Rhondda Cynon Taff districts. Southerndown Golf Club lies opposite the village.

External links 

Villages in the Vale of Glamorgan